Adjumani is a town in the  Northern Region of Uganda. It is the main municipal, administrative, and commercial centre of Adjumani District. The district is named after the town.

Location

The coordinates of the town are 3°22'38.0"N, 31°47'26.0"E (Latitude:3.377222; Longitude:31.790556).

Population
The 1991 national population census enumerated the population of 
the town at 2,108. In 2002, the census that year put the town's population at 19,876. The national census and household survey of 2014 enumerated the people in the town at 35,433 inhabitants.

In 2015, Uganda Bureau of Statistics (UBOS) estimated the population of Adjumani Town Council at 35,600 people. In 2020, the population agency put the town's population of the town at 37,100; of whom 19,400 (52.3 percent) were female and 17,700 (47.7 percent) were male. UBOS calculated that the population of the town increased at an average rate of 0.83 percent, annually, between 2015 and 2020.

Adjumani is also home to more than 200,000 refugees and asylum seekers from eight African countries, though the vast majority are from nearby South Sudan, making it host to the largest refugee population in the country.

Points of interest
The following additional points of interest lie within town or close to its borders: (a) the offices of Adjumani Town Council (b) the headquarters of Adjumani District Administration (c) Adjumani General Hospital, a 100-bed public hospital administered by the Uganda Ministry of Health and (d) Adjumani Airport, a civilian airdrome administered by the Uganda Civil Aviation Authority.

Notable people
 

Dominica Dipio, a Ugandan religious sister, filmmaker, author and professor

See also
 List of cities and towns in Uganda

References

External links
 The Refugee Problem In Adjumani In The Early 2000s

Adjumani District
West Nile sub-region
Populated places in Northern Region, Uganda